The following is a list of mayors of the city of Boa Vista, in Roraima state, Brazil.

 João Capistrano da Silva Mota, 1890-1895, 1921-1922, 1930-1935, 1942 
 Alfredo Venâncio de Sousa Cruz, 1895-1899 
 José Maria Medeiros, 1899-1902 
 Joaquim Rodrigues Araújo, 1902-1904 
 Raimundo Nava Rodrigues, 1904-1908 	
 Antônio Gomes Pereira Batista, 1908-1913	
 Raimundo Ferreira Catanhede, 1913-1917 
 Bento Ferreira Marques Brasil, 1917-1921	
 José Joaquim de Sousa Júnior, 1922-1924	
 Manuel Lopes de Magalhães, 1924	
 Arthur José Araújo, 1924	
 Luís Gomes do Vale Quadros, 1924-1926	
 Vítor da Silva Mota, 1926-1930	
 João Santos, 1935-1937	
 Jaime Brasil, 1937-1939	
 Ataliba Barroso, 1939-1941	
 João Alves de Sousa, 1941-1942	
 Sérgio Pessoa, 1942		
 Manoel Correia, 1942	
 Edson Marques de Araújo, 1942-1943	
 Aloísio Brasil, 1943	
 Adolfo Brasil, 1943-1944	
 Júlio Bezerra, 1944	
 Temístocles Henrique Trigueiro, 1944	
 , 1944-1945	
 Cândido Pena da Rocha, 1945-1946	
 Pandiá Batista Pires, 1946-1947	
 Antônio Augusto Martins, 1947-1949	
 Joaquim Pinto Souto Maior, 1949-1951	
 Mozart Cavalcanti, 1951, 1969-1972 	
 Aristóteles de Lima Carneiro, 1951-1952	
 Estácio Pereira de Melo, 1952-1953	
 Carlos Palma Lima, 1953-1955	
 Orlando Mota de Oliveira, 1955	
 Aquilino da Mota Duarte, 1955-1959 
 Newton Tavares, 1959-1961 
 Bernardino Dias de Sousa Cruz, 1961	
 Francisco de Assis Andrade, 1961-1963	
 Raimundo Marques, 1963-1964	
 Olavo Brasil, 1964-1967	
 Armênio Santos, 1967-1969	
 Antônio Maciel da Silveira, 1972	
 Francisco Zangerolame, 1972-1973	
 Aristóteles de Lima Carneiro, 1973	
 João de Assis Aragão, 1973	
 João Danilo Souto Maior Nogueira, 1973	
 Rufino Carneiro, 1973-1974	
 , 1974-1978	
 Luís Aimberê Soares de Freitas, 1978-1979	
 João Danilo Souto Maior Nogueira, 1979-1981	
 Rodolfo Hissa Abrahim, 1981-1982	
 Alcides Rodrigues dos Santos, 1982-1983	
 Miguel Guerra Balvé, 1983	
 João Danilo Souto Maior Nogueira, 1983	
 José Hamilton Gondim, 1983	
 Luís Renato Maciel de Melo, 1983-1984	
 Almir Queirós, 1984-1986	
 , 1986-1987	
 , 1987-1988
 José Maria Gomes Carneiro, 1988-1989	
 , 1989-1992	
 Teresa Surita, 1993-1996, 2001-2006, 2013-
 Ottomar Pinto, 1997-2000	
 , 2006-2012

See also
 
 List of mayors of largest cities in Brazil (in Portuguese)
 List of mayors of capitals of Brazil (in Portuguese)

References

This article incorporates information from the Portuguese Wikipedia.

Boa Vista